Happy Joe's is an American pizza parlor chain based in Bettendorf, Iowa. The restaurant chain was founded in 1972 by Lawrence Joseph "Happy Joe" Whitty, a former Shakey's Pizza manager. Their United States locations are spread out across the Upper Midwest and Florida, with a location in Egypt, which opened in October 2022. In 2022, Happy Joe's has declared an intent over 10 years to open at least 25 locations across the Middle East and North Africa, including in Bahrain, Egypt, Jordan, Kuwait, Morocco, Qatar, Saudi Arabia and the U.A.E. The idea for Happy Joe's came from a combination of a pizza parlor and ice cream palace.

On September 15, 2022, Happy Joe's filed for Chapter 11 bankruptcy, and would close several corporate-owned stores, although franchise-owned restaurants are not affected by the bankruptcy.

Products

Taco pizza
Joseph Whitty's "Happy Joe's" claimed to be the first pizza restaurant to offer a taco pizza (a pizza with refried bean/tomato sauce, cheese, lettuce, tomato and taco chips). After a franchisee suggested adding tacos to the menu, Whitty invented the restaurant's best-selling product, the Taco Pizza.

Breakfast pizza
In 2005, Happy Joe's started offering breakfast pizzas at select locations.

Flatbread pizza
In 2013, Happy Joe's started offering flatbread pizzas.

Gluten-free crusts
Happy Joe's also offers gluten-free crusts, designed for those with gluten allergies.

Birthday parties
It also features outlandish birthday parties. He was inspired to include birthday parties in his restaurant concept after he got disciplined after hosting one at the Shakey's Pizza he managed.

Joegurt
Joegurt is the chain's signature ice cream product that combines ice cream with yogurt. It is available at all the locations including the Pizza Grille locations. It is not currently sold in grocery stores.

History 
The chain was started in 1972 by Lawrence Joseph "Happy Joe" Whitty after he was disciplined for throwing a child a birthday party while working at Shakey's Pizza. Birthday parties became a centerpoint for the restaurant as did its signature taco pizza (claimed by the chain to be the first pizza place to offer such an item) and Joegurt (ice cream infused yogurt).

In the 1980s, the chain had operated a location in Cairo, Egypt that was shaped like a boat and was situated on the Nile River.

The chain has also expanded into other Midwestern markets with locations in Wisconsin, Minnesota, North Dakota, Missouri, and Illinois along with their home-state of Iowa.

The Happy Joe's location on Gilbert Street in Iowa City, Iowa was destroyed by a tornado on April 13, 2006, part of the Easter Week 2006 Tornado Outbreak Sequence. A follow-up restaurant in Coralville was lost to floods in 2008, but it was rebuilt and continued to operate.

In the mid-2010s, the chain debuted a new concept alongside the traditional restaurants called Happy Joe's Pizza Grille where you can get traditional American fare such as Rubens alongside their signature pizza and Joegurt. They also feature a small buffet featuring their pizzas as well.

The chain also had a presence in Arizona with two since closed stores, however, a return to Arizona is in the works with plans to open more restaurants in the state in the future.

On October 29, 2019, Happy Joe Whitty died at the age of 82 at the Clarissa C. Cook Hospice Center.

In 2022, the chain has plans to expand their operations to the Middle East and North Africa. They have plans to open at least 25 new restaurants across Bahrain, Egypt, Jordan, Kuwait, Morocco, Qatar, Saudi Arabia and the U.A.E. over the course of 10 years. The first locations the chain plans to openen in Cairo, Egypt, where they had one previously.

In addition to the aforementioned stores, they also have two restaurants in Florida, their first in the Southern United States. They also have stores planned for Branson (their first store outside of the St. Louis Metro), an additional store in the St. Louis metro, and an as of yet determined location in the Dallas-Fort Worth Metroplex. Cities floated for the proposed location include Grand Prairie, Cedar Hill, and Arlington, with plans to open in one of those cities before the end of 2023. This represents a milestone for the company as it will be their first minority-owned franchise in addition to being the first one in Texas.

See also

 List of pizza chains of the United States
 Quad City-style pizza

References

External links
 

1972 establishments in Iowa
Bettendorf, Iowa
Buffet restaurants
Companies based in the Quad Cities
Companies based in Iowa
Economy of the Midwestern United States
Ice cream parlors in the United States
Pizza chains of the United States
Regional restaurant chains in the United States
Restaurants established in 1972
Restaurants in Iowa
Iowa culture
American companies established in 1972
Companies that filed for Chapter 11 bankruptcy in 2022